LaSiete, formerly known as Telecinco 2, was a Spanish digital terrestrial television channel, operated by Mediaset España. It began its broadcasts on 18 February 2008, replacing Telecinco Sport. On 18 May 2009, Telecinco 2 changed its name to LaSiete. In early February 2014, it was confirmed that LaSiete would become a telenovela channel. On February 14, 2014, LaSiete officially became a new telenovelas channel and broadcast telenovelas until its closure in May.

History
The channel ceased broadcasting on 5 May 2014, as a consequence of a sentence by the Supreme Court that annulled the concessions for nine channels broadcasting in DTT, because their permissions for frequencies were granted without the required public consensus and assignments system according to the Audiovisual Law.

Logos

Telenovelas

Past Telenovelas
La Tempestad (February 14-April 21, 2014)
Mentir para Vivir (February 14-April 22, 2014)
Destilando Amor (February 17-May 5, 2014; Canceled)
Teresa (February 17-May 5, 2014; Canceled)
Mi Pecado (February 17-May 5, 2014; Canceled)
Rosalinda (March 31-May 5, 2014; Canceled)
Porque el Amor Manda (February 14-May 5, 2014; Canceled)
La madrastra (February 17-May 5, 2014; Canceled)

References

External links 
 

 LaSiete schedule

Channels of Mediaset España Comunicación
Defunct television channels in Spain
Television channels and stations established in 2008
Television channels and stations disestablished in 2014
Spanish-language television stations